"All to Myself" is the third single from Guy Sebastian's fifth album Like It Like That. John Mayer is featured playing guitar in the song. The single's B-sides are both covers of Michael Jackson songs. "All to Myself" was shortlisted for the 2011 APRA Song of the Year. A music video was produced to promote the single.

Track listing

Charts
The song debuted on the Australian ARIA Singles Chart on 7 March 2010 and spent three months in the ARIA Top 100, peaking at number 51. It was the third most added track to the radio in its debut week of release.

Release history

References

2010 singles
Guy Sebastian songs
Songs written by Guy Sebastian
2009 songs
Sony Music singles